Nogometni klub Domžale, commonly referred to as NK Domžale or simply Domžale, is a Slovenian football club that plays in the town of Domžale. They have won both the Slovenian League and the Slovenian Cup twice.

History

NK Domžale were founded in 1920 as SK Disk.

The club's golden age began in the summer of 2002, when Slaviša Stojanovič became a head coach and brought them into the Slovenian top division. In the 2005–06 season, they advanced through the first two qualifying rounds of the UEFA Cup before being eliminated in the first round by VfB Stuttgart. They played in the 2006–07 qualifying rounds, but were eliminated by Hapoel Tel Aviv. After a 4–0 win against Primorje on 13 May 2007, Domžale were confirmed as league champions for the first time. They won another league title in the 2007–08 season.

Stadium
Domžale play their home games at the Domžale Sports Park, which was built in 1948. The stadium was renovated and modernized in 1997 and 1999. Work on the new western stand started in October 2003 and was finished in April 2004. In June 2006, the stadium received floodlights, mounted on four concrete towers and placed at each corner of the stadium.

Players

Current squad

Honours
League
Slovenian PrvaLiga
Champions: 2006–07, 2007–08
Slovenian Second League
Champions: 2002–03

Cup
Slovenian Cup
Winners: 2010–11, 2016–17
Slovenian Supercup
Winners: 2007, 2011
MNZ Ljubljana Cup
Winners: 1992–93, 2002–03

Domestic league and cup results

*Best results are highlighted.

European record

Summary
As of 10 August 2021

Pld = Matches played; W = Matches won; D = Matches drawn; L = Matches lost; GF = Goals for; GA = Goals against.

By season
All results (home and away) list Domžale's goal tally first.

QR1 = First qualifying round; QR2 = Second qualifying round; QR3 = Third qualifying round; PO = Play-off round; R1 = First round.

References

External links

Official website 
PrvaLiga profile 
Soccerway profile

 
Association football clubs established in 1920
Football clubs in Yugoslavia
1920 establishments in Slovenia
Football clubs in Slovenia